Daniel Malloy (6 November 1930 – 14 January 2015) was a Scottish professional football player and manager.

Career

Beginning his senior career at Dundee, Malloy eventually moved to Cardiff City in December 1955 for a fee of £17,000 as a replacement for Stan Montgomery. He made his debut against Charlton Athletic soon after and became a mainstay of the side for several years. He was quick in making his mark as a footballing hard man, playing against Middlesbrough on 11 January 1958 he came up against prolific striker Brian Clough. Clough had been verbally riling Malloy throughout the match and as play went towards the Middlesbrough end Malloy swung a punch at Clough leaving him sprawled out on the pitch.

Although never a prolific scorer, at Cardiff Malloy was more famed for his scoring feats at the wrong end of the field, scoring a total of fourteen own goals during his six years at the club, including netting two in one match during a 3–2 victory over Liverpool on 22 August 1959. His only league goal for the club came from the penalty spot in the 1956–57 season in a 3–1 defeat to Manchester United. He took over as captain of the side during the 1959–1960 season as Cardiff gained promotion to the top flight as runners up to Aston Villa. At the end of the season in 1961 he could not agree terms with the club and left to become player-manager of Doncaster Rovers. He spent less than one season in charge at Belle Vue as the club spent struggled against relegation, taking charge of his last match on 17 March 1962 against Darlington. He later finished his career at Clyde.

During his career, Malloy won two caps for the Scotland B side.

Danny was also the first cousin of boxer Danny Malloy.

Managerial statistics

Honours
Cardiff City

 Welsh Cup Winner: 2
 1955–56, 1958–59
 Football League Second Division Runner-up: 1
 1959–60
 Welsh Cup Finalist: 1
 1959–60

References

External links
 
 

1930 births
Scottish footballers
Scottish football managers
Dundee F.C. players
Cardiff City F.C. players
Doncaster Rovers F.C. players
Doncaster Rovers F.C. managers
Clyde F.C. players
Scotland B international footballers
English Football League players
2015 deaths
Footballers from Falkirk (council area)
Scottish Football League players
Scottish Football League representative players
Association football central defenders
Camelon Juniors F.C. players